This is a list of diplomatic missions in Haiti. There are currently 19 embassies posted in Port-au-Prince.

Embassies in Port-au-Prince

Other posts in Port-au-Prince
 (Trade Office)
 (Delegation)

Consulates-General/Consulates 
Anse-à-Pitres

Belladère

Cap Haitien

Ouanaminthe

Non-Resident Embassies 

Resident in Havana, Cuba

 
 
 
 
 
  
 
  
  
 
 
 
  
  
 
 
 
 
 
  
 
 
 
 
 

Resident in Santo Domingo, Dominican Republic

 
 
 
 
 
 
 
 

Resident in Washington, D.C., United States

 
  
  
  
 
 

Resident in New York City, United States

 
 
 
 
 
  
 
 
 
 
 
 
 
  
 
  
  

Resident in other cities

  (Port-of-Spain)
  (Helsinki)
  (Caracas)
  (Ottawa)
  (Brasília)
  (Ottawa)
  (Bridgetown) 
  (Panama City)
  (Caracas)
  (Ottawa)
  (Mexico City)

Former Embassy
 Ethiopia (closed in 1967)

See also
Foreign relations of Haiti
List of diplomatic missions of Haiti
Visa policy of Haiti

Notes

References

Foreign relations of Haiti
Diplomatic missions
Haiti